St Patrick's Isle is a small tidal island on the west coast of the Isle of Man in the Irish Sea, largely occupied by Peel Castle and noted for its attractive and relatively well preserved historic castle ruins.

History
Archeological studies have shown permanent occupation on St Patrick's Isle dating to the Late Bronze Age. The ruins on St Patrick's Isle include St Patrick's Church and an Irish-style round tower, the former St German's Cathedral, and the more recent residence of the Lords of Mann. The ancient cathedral was left to decay in the 18th century, never to be rebuilt. The island's steep and rocky edges made it an ideal defensive outpost. It is said to be the place where St Patrick first set foot in the Isle of Man in 444 while returning from Liverpool to Ireland. Having established Christianity, he then appointed Germanus bishop, to oversee further development of the Church. However, there is debate as to whether the name "St Patrick's Isle" pre-dates the thirteenth century.

The islet is now a tourist site with the castle walls running close to the shoreline. There is a public walk around the outside of the castle, which lines the coastal edge of the islet. It is connected to the town of Peel on the Isle of Man by a causeway over Fenella Beach, named after the character in Sir Walter Scott's Peveril of the Peak. In addition to the historic ruins, the island is partially a sealife sanctuary.

References

External links 
 Manx Place Names 1925 – Parish of Kirk Patrick
 Isle-of-Man.com Peel Castle & St Patrick's Isle with aerial photo

Islands of the Isle of Man